Benjamin Gifford (c. 1688–1713), of Beaminster, Dorset, and Boreham, near Warminster, Wiltshire, was an English politician.

He was a Member (MP) of the Parliament of England for Dorchester from 1710 to June 1713.

References

1688 births
1713 deaths
18th-century English people
Politicians from Dorset
People from Wiltshire
Members of the Parliament of Great Britain for English constituencies